Vulgar Display of Power is the sixth studio album by American heavy metal band Pantera. Released on February 25, 1992, through Atco Records, it was the band's second collaboration with producer Terry Date, after having previously worked with him on their breakthrough album Cowboys from Hell (1990).

The album was well received by both critics and fans, and is Pantera's highest selling album to date and would eventually be certified double platinum. It is often considered one of the most influential heavy metal albums of the 1990s. In 2017, Rolling Stone ranked Vulgar Display of Power 10th on their list of 'The 100 Greatest Metal Albums of All Time'. Several of its tracks have become among the band's best known, such as "Mouth for War", "A New Level", "Walk", "Fucking Hostile", and "This Love".

Background
The band's 1990 major label debut, Cowboys from Hell,  demonstrated a change in their musical direction, from their 1980s material influenced by hard rock or glam metal bands like Van Halen and Kiss to a new similarity to bands like Slayer, Metallica and Black Sabbath.

Recording and production
In 1991, Pantera returned to Pantego Sound Studio to record their second release under Atco, Vulgar Display of Power.  The album was produced by Terry Date, who specializes in the rock and metal genres and had worked with the band on Cowboys from Hell. Date also went on to produce the band's following two albums, Far Beyond Driven (1994) and The Great Southern Trendkill (1996). Before Date came in to work on the album, the band had demoed three tracks, "A New Level", "Regular People (Conceit)" and "No Good (Attack the Radical)". The rest of the songs were written in the studio with little preproduction and demoing.

After being in the studio for two months, Pantera were invited to open for Metallica and AC/DC at the 1991 Monsters of Rock free concert in Moscow, Russia's Tushino airfield on September 28, 1991. The band then returned to the studio to continue work on the album. They travelled to New York City to master the album at Masterdisk. Although guitarist Darrell Abbott was credited on the album with nickname "Diamond Darrell", during the recording of the album he had dropped that nickname and assumed "Dimebag Darrell", and bassist Rex Brown dropped the pseudonym "Rexx Rocker".

Musical style and lyrics
Drummer Vinnie Paul said that Cowboys from Hell was really close to the "definitive Pantera sound". When Metallica released their self titled album in 1991, Pantera considered it a letdown to fans because they believed Metallica abandoned the thrash metal sound heard in previous albums. Pantera felt they had an opportunity and a gap to fill; they wanted to make the heaviest record of all time.

The riff for "Walk" is played in a time signature of 12/8.  Darrell had played the riff during a soundcheck while Pantera was touring for Cowboys from Hell and the rest of the band loved it. Following this tour, the band returned home and found that some friends thought that rock stardom had gone to their heads. The lyrics for the song were inspired from these people's attitude toward the band; Anselmo's message to them was, "Take your fucking attitude and take a fuckin' walk with that. Keep that shit away from me."

Title and artwork
The title of the album is taken from a line in the 1973 film, The Exorcist. (Priest: "If you're the Devil, why not make the straps disappear?". Girl: "That's much too vulgar a display of power, Karras.") In April 2007, the title was used for the book A Vulgar Display of Power: Courage and Carnage at the Alrosa Villa, which includes many Pantera song titles as chapter headings. The book details the incidents leading up to the murder of Dimebag Darrell.

The album's cover is a photo of a man being "punched" in the face and was shot by photographer Brad Guice, who also shot the photo for the Cowboys from Hell cover. The band told their label that they wanted "something vulgar, like a dude getting punched". The first version of the cover that the label brought to the band showed a boxer with a boxing glove, but the band did not like it, so the label produced a second version, with the bare fist. A popular rumor that was stirred up by Vinnie Paul was that the man on the cover was paid $10 a punch and was hit in the face a total of 31 (Rex Brown claiming 32) times to get the right picture. However, Guice dispelled this when he confirmed that the man, who was a hired model named Sean Cross, was never actually hit.

Release
Vulgar Display of Power was released on February 25, 1992. The original album spawned four singles. "Mouth for War", "This Love" and "Hollow" were released in 1992. In 1993, the band released the fourth single, titled "Walk", along with a number of EP's featuring remixes of the song. In 1993, the Walk EP was released in Japan, but on May 16, 2012, the EP was made available to purchase digitally in the United States for the first time. The band also released music videos for "Mouth for War", "This Love" and "Walk", they were included on Vulgar Video and 3 Vulgar Videos from Hell. The music video for "Walk" was shot at the Riviera Theatre in Chicago, Illinois, where the band played the song multiple times to capture live video footage in front of fans.

On April 12, 2012, the unheard song "Piss" was released, which was recorded during the sessions for the album but never featured on the original album. Drummer Vinnie Paul had re-discovered the song while looking through old Pantera recordings. The music video for "Piss" debuted at the Revolver Golden Gods Awards, on April 11, 2012. The main riff from "Piss" was used in the song "Use My Third Arm" on the band's following record Far Beyond Driven.

Tour and media appearances
To promote the album, Pantera toured with Skid Row and Soundgarden giving them the opportunity to perform in front of a mainstream audience in the United States. After touring with Skid Row the band did a European tour with Megadeth.  The band also toured with White Zombie in 1992. The unique sound and the band's explosive live performances helped them gain more popularity.

The music videos for singles from the album were played in relatively heavy rotation on MTV. Also during the 1990s, MTV's Headbangers Ball used excerpts from the album's songs for the show's opening theme, bumpers, and closing theme. "Walk" and "Mouth for War" are available as downloadable tracks for the video game Rock Band 3.  "Walk" was also featured on Madden NFL 10, CSI: NY and Monday Night Football.

"By Demons Be Driven" appears in the 2015 Academy Award-nominated film The Big Short: actor Christian Bale is seen performing along to the song on drums, which he learned for that one scene.

20th anniversary reissue
On May 15, 2012, a two-disc deluxe edition of Vulgar Display of Power was released to celebrate its 20th anniversary.  Disc one is a remastered version of the original album along with the song "Piss". Disc two is a DVD featuring six songs from Pantera's set at their 1992 Monsters of Rock performance in Reggio Emilia, Italy. Disc two also contains the three music videos for "Mouth for War", "Walk" and "This Love". Vinnie Paul said that "Piss" was "the only undiscovered complete Pantera track there ever was" and it would appear on the 20th anniversary release.  He also said that at the time of the original release, the band thought that it didn't feel right to go on the record.

Critical reception

Vulgar Display of Power received critical acclaim upon release.  Many critics have praised Darrell's guitar work on the album and use of heavy riffs and tone to set the tone for the album. Reviewers also pointed out the change in Anselmo's vocals from previous releases, with him using deeper growls and powerful vocals to accompany the catchy riffs and aggressive lyrics.

Kerrang! and Sputnikmusic both gave the album 4 out of 5. Steve Huey of AllMusic rated the album 4.5 out of 5 stars, describing it as "One of the most influential heavy metal albums of the 1990s". He also said that while the album stacks the best songs at the beginning, the riffs and sonic textures are more consistently interesting than those used in Cowboys from Hell. Janiss Garza writing for Entertainment Weekly said that it was "one of the most satisfying heavy metal records since Metallica's early-80s cult days". She also praised the album's two ballad tracks "This Love" and "Hollow", stating "their tough edge slashes painfully through deep introspection about personal relationships".

Reviewing the 20th anniversary reissue, Michael Christopher of The Phoenix rated the album 3.5 out of 4 stars stating while the bonus track "Piss" does not match up to the rest of the material, the groove that flows through the original record is the muscle behind what mattered most. Denise Falzon of Exclaim! stated that the reissue sounds a little cleaner from the enhanced production quality. She noted that "Piss" does sound oddly out of place on the reissue, but the release is worthwhile for the DVD showcasing the band's dynamic live performance. In 2005, Vulgar Display of Power was ranked number 333 in Rock Hard magazine's book The 500 Greatest Rock & Metal Albums of All Time.

Commercial performance
Vulgar Display of Power peaked at number 44 on the Billboard 200 albums chart and spent a total of 79 weeks on the chart, the most weeks any Pantera album spent on the chart. The album also peaked at number 64 on the UK Albums Chart, number 69 on the German Chart, and number 54 on the Oricon Chart. The album has since gone on to become Pantera's best selling album, attaining many certifications since its release including double platinum status in the United States. The album achieved gold status in Canada, in August 1993 and has achieved gold status in the UK.  The album has also achieved a platinum certification in Australia.  In the week ending May 20, 2012, the album re-entered the Billboard 200 chart at number 48, taking the total sales to 2,177,000 copies.  This was due to release of the 20th Anniversary reissue which sold over 9000 copies in the U.S. during its first week.

The album's lead single, "Mouth for War", became the band's first song to ever chart, debuting in October 1992 on the UK Singles Chart and managing to peak at number 73. The album's fourth single "Walk" gave the band their first top 40 UK hit when it peaked at number 35 in early 1993.

Legacy and accolades
Vulgar Display of Power has been listed as one of the 1001 Albums You Must Hear Before You Die. Chad Bowar of About.com ranked the album at number one in his list of the "Best Heavy Metal Albums of 1992" stating that "Pantera was head and shoulders above the rest of the field.". He also ranked the album second in the "Best Heavy Metal Albums of the 1990s" list behind Megadeth's Rust in Peace (1990). In October 2011, the album was ranked number four on Guitar World magazine's list of "The Top 10 Guitar Albums of 1992". The album was ranked number one on Loudwires "Top 11 Metal Albums of the 1990s" and their "Top 10 Albums of 1992" and the song "Walk" was ranked number seven in their "10 Catchiest Metal Songs". Loudwire also listed four of the album's songs in their list of the "10 Best Pantera songs", they placed "This Love" in seventh, "Mouth for War" in fifth, "Fucking Hostile" in third and "Walk" in first. IGN named Vulgar Display of Power the eleventh most influential heavy metal album ever on their list of the "Top 25 Metal Albums". They said about the album:

"This album makes the list because it took heavy metal and made it heavier. It took darkness and made it darker. It took anger and made it angrier. Never before had a band tuned down its guitars and crunched a heavier riff than on this album. 'Mouth for War' and 'A New Level' and 'No Good (Attack the Radical)' stand out on an album where every track is a classic track. Dimebag Darrell was an innovator and a true godsend for heavy metal. One of the most underrated players in the genre. And this may sound corny, but the way the band was able to turn seemingly negative aspects of the genre – hate, anger, violence and despair – into positive thoughts is somewhat akin to De La Soul dropping a positive message into rap."

In 2017, Rolling Stone ranked Vulgar Display of Power as 10th on their list of "The 100 Greatest Metal Albums of All Time".

The song "Walk" has been covered by a number of bands and artists.

In 2022, Guitar World ranked Vulgar Display of Power #1 on their list of "The 30 greatest rock guitar albums of 1992".

Track listing

PersonnelPanteraPhil Anselmo – vocals
Diamond Darrell – guitars
Rex Brown – bass
Vinnie Paul – drums, engineering, mixing, productionTechnical'
Terry Date – engineering, mixing, production
Howie Weinberg – mastering
Doug Sax – vinyl mastering
Brad Guice – photography
Joe Giron – photography
Bob Defrin – artwork
Larry Freemantle – design

Charts

Certifications

References

Album chart usages for Billboard200
1992 albums
Pantera albums
Albums produced by Terry Date
Atco Records albums